Tumed Right Banner is a banner of western Inner Mongolia, People's Republic of China. It is under the administration of Baotou City,  to the west, and is located along on the Jingzang Expressway, running from Beijing to Tibet.

Climate

See also
Manhan folk song

External links
www.xzqh.org

References

Banners of Inner Mongolia